Dibaklu may refer to:
 Dibaklu, Charuymaq
 Dibaklu, Heris
 Dibaklu, Sarab